Rowe Street is a narrow laneway in the central business district of Sydney in New South Wales, Australia. Originally, Rowe Street ran between Castlereagh Street and Pitt Street, parallel to Martin Place. However, it now runs east–west off Pitt Street. Rowe Street was named in honour of Thomas Rowe, a prominent architect in New South Wales.

History
Rowe Street was a centre for Sydney's bohemian life from the late 19th century until the 1970s, described in 1931 as "the primrose path of dalliance"–furthermore it may have been the birthplace of Sydney's famous push movement.  The precinct included the original Theatre Royal, the Playbox Theatre, art studios and galleries, restaurants, cafés and coffee shops, many well-known fashion, clothing, interior design and jewellery shops, and Rowe Street Records, one of the first specialist import record stores in Australia.

Most of the Rowe Street precinct, including the palatial Hotel Australia, was demolished in the early 1970s to make way for the MLC Centre, a monolithic modernist edifice designed by controversial Sydney architect Harry Seidler. A small section remains today as link from Pitt street to Lees Circuit and the entrance to the shopping Centre and food court, below the MLC Centre. The beautiful old building on the corner of Pitt and Rowe Streets was the Millions Club and later became the Sydney Club still remains to-day, the only original building in the laneway.

See also

References

External links
  [CC-By-SA]

Streets in Sydney
Sydney central business district